Islamic Republic of Iran Army Aviation (IRIAA) (in ), more commonly known as Havānīrūz, is the army aviation of the Iranian Army ground forces. It is the largest and most professional army aviation service in the Middle East, possessing no less than 300 helicopters both for attack and transport uses. It is also the most experienced in the region, having fought the brutal Iran–Iraq War in the 80s, in which the Havanirooz played a crucial role in destroying and defeating the invading Iraqi armies.

Along with its primary military role of aviation support for the ground forces, the Army Aviation is also involved in emergency management missions, such as search and rescue, medical evacuation, and forest firefighting.

Havanirooz members have the same rank insignia and titles as the rest of the Army.

Role
The main role of Havanirooz is aviation support for ground forces. Its military role include assault duties, anti-tank warfare, reconnaissance, liaison, escorting military columns and transportation, special operations, infiltration operations, directing artillery and mortar fire, as a covering force, delivering suppressive fire, illuminating the battlefield, combat search and rescue (CSAR), as well as air-to-air combat (see the  section).

Beside military duties, Havanirooz is also involved in civil duties, including emergency management (firefighting, medevac, search and rescue) and aerial photography.

History

Imperial Iranian Army Aviation

The core of the force was established in 1962 as the Imperial Iranian Army Aviation (IIAA) during the Pahlavi era as part of the Imperial Iranian Army with 6 Cessna 180 (U-17) aircraft and 6 pilots based in Isfahan. Meanwhile, officers were sent to the United States to be trained. The number of aircraft was 30 by 1966. In that year, 17 Kaman HH-43B Huskie helicopters were purchased from the United States. Iran also received 12 Cessna O-2As (which still can fly but are out of service). In 1971, the unit was expanded from an Aviation Battalion into an Aviation Regiment, with the purchase of Agusta-Bell 205A Iroquois and Agusta-Bell 206 JetRanger helicopters from Italy. Officers being sent to Italy for the related flight and technical courses. The Cessnas were phased out of service as the 205A's became operational.

In 1973, a group of American advisors arrived in Iran to assess the geography and climate of the country, and eventually it was decided to establish three combat units in Kermanshah, Masjed Soleyman, and Kerman, and one general support unit in Isfahan, and a pilot and technical education center at Vatanpour Airbase; a total number of 202 Bell AH-1J Internationals (62 of which were TOW-capable) and  287 Bell 214A/C Isfahan helicopters were purchased from the United States, and American trainers were stationed at the Isfahan and Kermanshah education centers. Army Aviation was supposed to have become fully operational by 1982; however, the project was interrupted by the 1979 Revolution.
Iran also took delivery of 70 Boeing (Elicotteri Meridionali) CH-47C Chinooks and 11 more after the Revolution from Italy.

Imperial Iranian Army Aviation was one of the Iranian forces that participated in Dhofar Rebellion in Oman.

1979 Revolution
After the 1979 Revolution, then-commander of the Imperial Iranian Army Aviation Manouchehr Khosrodad was executed; he was  also the founder and former commander of the 23rd Airborne Special Forces Brigade (also known as NOWHED).

The force, which is now called Islamic Republic of Iran Army Aviation, participated in the post-Revolution clashes with the Kurds in Kermanshah (such as in breaking the Siege of Paveh) and Kordestan provinces.

Iran–Iraq War
The Iran–Iraq War saw the most intensive use of helicopters in a conventional conflict ever. IRIAA flew more than 300,000 hours in direct support of the operations throughout the war, in addition to around 59,000 hours in training sorties, with an average of 100 hours recorded flight per day overall during the war.

During the initial months of the war, the Army Aviation, usually operating on its own and using intelligence from local people, managed to stop Iraqi tanks from further advancing into the western territories of Iran. This was being done usually by using units consisting of AH-1J SeaCobras and a Bell 206 JetRanger. Among the Iranians, the Cobras gained a reputation as good as those of the F-14 Tomcats and the F-4 Phantom II.

Iranian AH-1Js (particularly the TOW-capable ones) were "exceptionally effective" in anti-armour warfare, inflicting heavy losses on Iraqi armoured and vehicle formations. In operations over the barren terrain in Khuzestan and later in southern Iraq, beside the standard tactics, Iranian pilots developed special, effective tactics, often in the same manner as the Soviets did with their Mi-24s. Due to the post-Revolution weapons sanctions, Iranians equipped the AH-1Js with the AGM-65 Maverick missiles and used it in some operations with some success.

Starting from October 1980, the AH-1Js engaged in air-to-air combat with Iraqi Mil Mi-24 helicopters on several, separate occasions during the Iran–Iraq War (the only war with confirmed "dogfights" between helicopters). The results of these engagements are disputed. One document cited that Iranian AH-1Js took on Iraqi Mi-8 and Mi-24 helicopters.  Sources report that the Iranian AH-1 pilots achieved a 10:1 kill ratio over the Iraqi helicopter pilots during these engagements (1:5). Additionally, one source states that 10 Iranian AH-1Js were lost in the war, compared to six lost Iraqi Mi-24s. The skirmishes are described as fairly evenly matched in another source. Mi-24 was more powerful and faster, but the AH-1J was more agile. There were even engagements between Iranian AH-1J and Iraqi fixed-wing aircraft. Using their 20 mm calibre canon, the AH-1Js scored three confirmed kills against MiG-21s, claimed a Su-20, and shared in the destruction of a MiG-23.

About half of the AH-1Js were lost during the conflict from combat, accidents, and simple wear and tear.

Ahmad Keshvari and Ali Akbar Shiroodi were two prominent pilots of the IRIAA, both of whom were killed in the Iran–Iraq War. December 7, the date of Ahmad Keshvari's death, is the "Havanirooz Day" in Iranian Military calendar, and has been proposed by Iranian Army to be added to the official Iranian calendar.

Contemporary
From 1979 to 2011, more than 800,000 flight hours have been logged by the Havanirooz. Thus, many of the helicopters delivered  before the Revolution need to be repaired and refurbished, the Iranian Helicopter Support and Renewal Company (IHSRC; also known as PANHA or Panha) has been founded for this purpose. Iran Aircraft Manufacturing Industrial Company (HESA) is also manufacturing new helicopters, usually based on those that Iran already has in its arsenal.

Equipment

Current aircraft inventory 

Based on reports published by the Flightglobal Insight and the International Institute of Strategic Studies, as of 2020 the inventory includes:

Headquarters

 Isfahan Training Centre
 Kermanshah 1st Combat Base
 Masjed Soleiman 2nd Combat Base
 Kerman 3rd Combat Base
 Isfahan 4th Combat and Logistics Base
 Qaleh Morghi Logistics Base
 Havanirooz Mashhad Base
 Havanirooz Tabriz Base

Organization
Iran Aviation Industries Organization (IAIO)
Iran Aircraft Manufacturing Industrial Company (HESA)
Iranian Helicopter Support and Renewal Company (IHSRC, also known as PANHA)

References

 http://www.aja.ir/Portal/Home/ShowPage.aspx?Object=News&CategoryID=b8789b0b-9886-4e12-94fb-8ecaaa0f102e&WebPartID=dec2520c-2881-448a-a61c-15883a9d5fd8&ID=5d611f2d-8daa-4dc8-9542-f2296d86e3b9
 http://www.magiran.com/npview.asp?ID=2273803

External links

IRIAA videos in Aparat
IRIAA photo gallery in official website of Iranian Army

Ground Forces of Islamic Republic of Iran Army
Army aviation of Iran
1962 establishments in Iran